Athletics at the 1963 Mediterranean Games were held in Naples, Italy.

Results

Medal table

References

External links
Complete 1963 Mediterranean Games Standings

Med
Athletics
1963